Mansour Bahrami and Mark Philippoussis were the defending champions, but chose not to participate together. Bahrami plays alongside Fabrice Santoro, whereas Philippoussis plays alongside Tommy Haas.

Draw

Final

Group stage

References

External links
 Men's Legends Doubles
 Men's Legends Doubles Profiles

Men's Legends Doubles